Andriy Pushkar (August 6, 1985 – November 14, 2018) also known as Andrey Pushkar, was a Ukrainian professional arm wrestler and bodybuilder.

Early life
Andrey Pushkar was born in the city of Kremenets, Ukraine on August 6, 1985. When he was 11-years old, he saw the movie Commando with Arnold Schwarzenegger and decided to become an athlete. In 2003, Pushkar won in the heavyweight division of arm wrestling competition where he took his first world championship medal.

Death
On November 14, 2018, while driving in Rivne region, along with Oleg Zhokh and Oleg's father, Andrey Pushkar was killed in a traffic collision. Oleg Zhokh was comatose and Oleg's father died. According to the media report, the Ukrainian athlete from Ostroh District was the driver of Citroën. He lost control of the car due to oncoming traffic and collided with a truck. The accident occurred on a highway between Hai-Lev'yatyns'ki and Krupets villages.

References

1985 births
2018 deaths
Male arm wrestlers
Ukrainian bodybuilders
Ukrainian sportsmen